Calcium/calmodulin dependent protein kinase II inhibitor 1 is a protein that in humans is encoded by the CAMK2N1 gene.

References

Further reading